ARC may refer to:

Business
 Aircraft Radio Corporation, a major avionics manufacturer from the 1920s to the '50s
 Airlines Reporting Corporation, an airline-owned company that provides ticket distribution, reporting, and settlement services
 Airport Regions Conference, a European organization of major airports
 Amalgamated Roadstone Corporation, a British stone quarrying company
 American Record Company (1904–1908, re-activated 1979), one of two United States record labels by this name
 American Record Corporation (1929–1938), a United States record label also known as American Record Company
 ARC (American Recording Company) (1978-present), a vanity label for Earth, Wind & Fire
 ARC Document Solutions, a company based in California, formerly American Reprographics Company
 Amey Roadstone Construction, a former British construction company
 Aqaba Railway Corporation, a freight railway in Jordan
 ARC/Architectural Resources Cambridge, Inc., Cambridge, Massachusetts
 ARC Diversified, a Cookeville, Tennessee non-profit that employs the severely disabled
 ARC International, a computer processor designer, and a subsidiary of Synopsys 
 ARC Resources, a Canadian oil and natural gas company
 Arena Racing Company, a British racecourse owning group

Computing
 Adaptive replacement cache, a cache management algorithm
 Advanced Resource Connector, middleware for computational grids
 Advanced RISC Computing, a specification
 Google App Runtime for Chrome, a compatibility layer and sandboxing technology to run Android applications on Chromebook computers
 ARC (file format), a lossless data compression and archival file format
 Automatic Relay Computer, an early electromechanical computer
 ARC (processor), a family of embedded microprocessors
 ARC Macro Language, a high-level algorithmic language
 Audio Return Channel, a feature of HDMI 1.4
 Authenticated Received Chain, an email authentication system
 Automatic Reference Counting, an Objective-C and Swift memory management feature
 Intel Arc, a brand of graphics processing units designed by Intel

Culture
 Advance reading copy of a book, for reviewers, etc.
 ARC Europe, association of motoring clubs
 ARChive of Contemporary Music, a music repository in New York City, US
 ARC Magazine (Art. Recognition. Culture.), Caribbean
 Art Renewal Center, online realist art museum
 Canadian artist-run centres

Government and politics
 Administrative Reforms Commission, an Indian Government commission
 Administrative Reform Council, the military regime that governed Thailand following the 2006 coup d'état
 Alien registration card (Japan), for foreign residents of Japan
 Alien Resident Certificate, for foreign residents of Taiwan
 Appalachian Regional Commission, a United States federal-state partnership
 Atlanta Regional Commission, a regional planning and intergovernmental coordination agency
 Auckland Regional Council, a former New Zealand local government entity
 Australian Research Council, a government agency for allocating research funding
 Autonomous Republic of Crimea, an internationally recognized autonomous republic in Ukraine
 Royal Canadian Air Force

Humanitarian, activist and religious organizations
 Abortion Rights Campaign, Ireland
 African Rainforest Conservancy
 Alliance of Reformed Churches
 Alliance of Religions and Conservation, UK
 American Red Cross
 American Refugee Committee
 Anti-Recidivism Coalition, Los Angeles, US
 ARC Association for Real Change, of UK providers of services to people with a learning disability
 Arc of the United States
 Arthritis Research Campaign, UK
 Australian Red Cross
 Society for the Arts, Religion and Contemporary Culture, US

Research and science
 Agricultural Research Council, a former British organisation that funded agricultural research
 Alberta Research Council, government funded applied R&D corporation
 ARC fusion reactor, Affordable, Robust Compact reactor, a reactor design from MIT
 Ames Research Center, a NASA facility located at Moffett Federal Airfield, California
 Archival Research Catalog, National Archives and Records Administration catalog
 Arthritis Research Campaign, a British medical research charity
 Astrophysical Research Consortium, the organization that operates the Apache Point Observatory
 Augmentation Research Center, a center founded by electrical engineer Douglas Engelbart
 Australian Research Council, the Australian Government's main research funding body for tertiary institutions
 Auto Research Center, a specialized aerodynamics and automotive research and consulting company
 Aviation Research Centre, a part of the Research and Analysis Wing (R&AW) of the Cabinet Secretariat, India
 ARC (protein) (activity-regulated cytoskeleton-associated protein)
 AIDS-related complex, a condition in which antibody tests are positive for HIV
 Agulhas Return Current, an ocean current in the Indian Ocean
 Archaeological Review from Cambridge, a UK journal
 Automation and Remote Control, a Russian periodical
 Arcuate nucleus, an aggregation of neurons in the mediobasal hypothalamus
Allergic rhinoconjunctivitis, inflammation of the conjunctiva and nose due to allergy
 Augmented renal clearance, a pharmacokinetic consideration in critically ill persons
Abstraction and Reasoning Corpus, an open-source dataset that is used as a general artificial intelligence benchmark

Sports
 Adelaide Rowing Club, in Adelaide, South Australia
 African Rally Championship, international automobile rally
 Anteater Recreation Center, an indoor gym at the University of California, Irvine 
 American Rivers Conference, an NCAA Division III athletic conference operating mainly in Iowa with one member in Nebraska
 Americas Rugby Championship
 SV ARC (Alphense Racing Club), Alphen aan den Rijn, Netherlands, a Dutch football club
 Athletics–Recreation Center, a 5,000-seat multi-purpose arena on the campus of Valparaiso University in Valparaiso, Indiana
 Atlanta Rowing Club, Roswell, Georgia
 Atlantic Rally for Cruisers, a transatlantic sailing competition
 Australian Rally Championship
 Australian Rugby Championship (August–October 2007), rugby union

Other uses
 Anti-reflective coating
 American River College, Sacramento County, California, US
 Academy of Richmond County, Augusta, Georgia, US
 Access to the Region's Core, cancelled commuter rail project, New York, US
 Anaheim Rapid Connection, a proposed streetcar line
 Activity relationship chart, of closeness between activities
 ARC, US Navy hull classification symbol for cable repair ship
 Army Reconnaissance Course, US Army Armor School, Fort Knox, Kentucky
 ARC (Callsign), Colombian Navy abbreviation and ship prefix
 ARC triangle, Affinity, Reality and Communication, in Scientology
 Attack Retrieve Capture, a computer game
 arc, the ISO 639-2 code for the Aramaic language
 Alarm monitoring center, also known as alarm receiving center (ARC)

See also
 Arch (disambiguation)
 ARCS (disambiguation)
 Ark (disambiguation)